Daniel Pearce (born 22 January 1993) is a former professional Australian rules footballer who played for the Western Bulldogs in the Australian Football League (AFL). He was drafted with pick No. 49 in the 2011 national draft. Pearce made his debut in round 9, 2012, against  at Etihad Stadium. He was delisted at the conclusion of the 2015 AFL season.

References

External links

1993 births
Living people
VFL/AFL players born outside Australia
Western Bulldogs players
Australian rules footballers from Victoria (Australia)
Oakleigh Chargers players